Samantha Fish (born January 30, 1989) is an American singer-songwriter and guitarist from Kansas City, Missouri. While often cited as a blues artist, Fish's albums and live shows feature multiple genres, including rock, country, funk, bluegrass and ballads.

Her elder sister, Amanda Fish, is also a singer-songwriter, recording for VizzTone Records.

Early life and education
Samantha Fish grew up in Kansas City, Missouri and started out playing the drums, but when she was 15, she switched to guitar.

Fish's mother was the instructor in a local church choir and her father played guitar with friends. Initially hearing recordings of Bonnie Raitt and Stevie Ray Vaughan, she later heard music from Tom Petty and The Rolling Stones and cites the Stones' album Sticky Fingers as an influential moment. Samantha and her sister were both drawn towards blues music in their teenage years.

Fish regularly went to the Knuckleheads Saloon to hear touring blues artists. After turning 18, she often joined in with the singers and bands who were performing there.

Career

In 2009, Fish recorded and produced Live Bait. The live album attracted the attention of a talent company, who recommended her to Ruf Records. Ruf Records put together a record with Fish and two other female blues artists, Cassie Taylor and Dani Wilde, titled Girls with Guitars. The three guitarists then toured on the Ruf Records 2011 Blues Caravan in the U.S. and Europe.

Fish continued touring with the Samantha Fish Band, featuring "Go-Go Ray" Pollard on drums and Chris Alexander on bass, playing in Europe and the United States.  In 2011, Fish recorded Runaway with the help of her mentor Mike Zito. The album won the 2012 Blues Music Award for Best New Artist.

Fish appeared on Devon Allman's 2013 album Turquoise in a duet covering the Tom Petty/Stevie Nicks' song "Stop Draggin' My Heart Around". During the summer of 2013, Fish was called up on stage to play with a skeptical Buddy Guy who was so impressed with her playing on the guitar, he  declared with a beaming smile to his audience, "When this kind of shit happens, I'll play all night!"

In 2013, Fish released her second major studio album, Black Wind Howlin''', featuring Mike Zito on guitar, Yonrico Scott on drums, Johnny Sansone on harmonica, and Paul Thorn, vocal duet on one track. The album was recorded in Dockside Studios, in Maurice, Louisiana.  Mike Zito's bandmates from his group Royal Southern Brotherhood, Yonrico Scott and Charlie Wooton, were brought in to assist in the session recordings.

Also in 2013, Fish appeared on The Healers Live at Knuckleheads Saloon, producing a CD/DVD collaboration with Jimmy Hall, Reese Wynans, Kate Moss, and Danielle and Kris Schnebelen (sister and brother, formerly of the band Trampled Under Foot). Proceeds benefit the Blue Star Connection. The Healers occasionally perform together as their schedule permits.

Fish's third studio album, Wild Heart was released on July 10, 2015.  The new album is more roots rock than her earlier blues rock. Fish wrote five songs on the record. She co-wrote five other songs with Jim McCormick in Nashville, Tennessee. Luther Dickinson produced the album, as well as played various stringed instruments (guitar, bass, mandolin, lap steel) to flesh out the sound. The album was recorded in four studios, Royal Studios and Ardent Studios in Memphis, Tennessee, Zebra Ranch in Coldwater, Mississippi, and Blade Studios in Shreveport, Louisiana. Other musicians on the record are Brady Blade (drums), Lightnin' Malcolm (guitar), Shardé Thomas (drums), Dominic Davis (bass), Shontelle Norman-Beatty (background vocals), and Risse Norman (background vocals).

Fish released her fourth solo album, Chills & Fever on March 17, 2017. The album was recorded in Detroit and was recorded with members of the band The Detroit Cobras. Bobby Harlow produced the album. Belle of the West followed in December 2017.

Fish released her sixth solo album, Kill or Be Kind, on September 20, 2019, on her new label, Rounder Records. It was chosen as a 'Favorite Blues Album' by AllMusic.

Fish released her seventh solo album, Faster, on September 10, 2021, on Rounder Records. The album was produced by Martin Kierszenbaum, and features drummer Josh Freese and bass player Diego Navaira of The Last Bandoleros. Kansas City area rapper Tech N9ne is featured on the song "Loud".

Personal life
Her older sister is Amanda Fish, a fellow American blues singer-songwriter and multi-instrumentalist.

Discography
Albums
{| class="wikitable"
|-
! Title 
! Year 
! Artist
! Label 
! Producer
|-
| Live Bait 
| 2009
| The Samantha Fish Blues Band
| The Samantha Fish Blues Band
| Steve McBride
|-
| Girls with Guitars 
| 2011
| Samantha Fish / Cassie Taylor / Dani Wilde 
| Ruf
| Mike Zito
|-
| Runaway 
| 2011
| Samantha Fish 
| Ruf
| Mike Zito
|-
| Girls with Guitars Live CD/DVD 
| 2012
| Samantha Fish / Dani Wilde / Victoria Smith
| Ruf
| Uwe Treskatis, Thomas Ruf
|-
| Black Wind Howlin' 
| 2013
| Samantha Fish 
| Ruf
| Mike Zito
|-
| The Healers (CD/DVD)
| 2013
| Jimmy Hall / Reese Wynans / Samantha Fish / Kate Moss / Danielle Schnebelen / Kris Schnebelen
| Blue Star Connection
| Stellar Press
|-
| Wild Heart| 2015
| Samantha Fish
| Ruf
| Luther Dickinson
|-
| Chills & Fever| 2017
| Samantha Fish
| Ruf
| Bobby Harlow
|-
| Belle of the West| 2017
| Samantha Fish
| Ruf
| Luther Dickinson
|-
| Kill or Be Kind| 2019
| Samantha Fish
| Rounder
| Scott Billington
|-
| Faster| 2021
| Samantha Fish
| Rounder
| Martin Kierszenbaum
|}

Awards
Fish has won the following awards:
Best New Artist Debut – 2012 Blues Music Awards in Memphis
Artist of the Year – 2016 Independent Blues Awards
Best Independent Female Blues Artist – 2016 Independent Blues Awards
Best Independent Blues Contemporary CD (for Wild Heart (Ruf Records)) – 2016 Independent Blues Awards
Best Modern Roots Song (for "Go Home" from the album, Wild Heart) – 2016 Independent Blues Awards
Road Warrior – 2016 Independent Blues Awards
Best Contemporary Blues Album (for Chills & Fever (Ruf Records)) - 2017 Blues Blast Music Awards
Best Independent Female Blues Artist – 2017 Independent Blues Awards
Road Warrior – 2017 Independent Blues Awards
Best Blues Album (for Belle of the West (Ruf Records)) – 2017 Best of the Beat Awards
Best Modern Roots CD (for Belle of the West (Ruf Records)) – 2018 Independent Blues Awards
Best Independent Blues-Soul Artist – 2018 Independent Blues Awards
Best Stage Performance – 2018 Independent Blues Awards
Road Warrior – 2018 Independent Blues Awards
Song for Common Good (for "American Dream" from the album Belle of the West)– 2018 Independent Blues Awards
Female Blues Artist of the Year (Readers' Poll) – 2018 Annual Living Blues Awards
Contemporary Blues Female Artist of the Year – 2018 Blues Music Awards
Best Female Vocalist – 2018 Best of the Beat Awards
Best Blues Performer – 2018 Best of the Beat Awards
Best Guitarist – 2018 Best of the Beat Awards
Artist of the Year – 2018 Best of the Beat Awards

Fish won Making a Scene's 2020 Independent Blues Awards for: 
Artist of the Year 
Female Artist of the Year 
Producer of the Year 
Best Soul Artist 
Best Soul CD "Kill or Be Kind" 
Best Music Video "Kill or Be Kind" 
Best Modern Roots song "Kill or Be Kind" 
Gateway Artist 
Road Warrior Award 
CD of the Year

 Charts 
 Black Wind Howlin Top Heatseekers at No. 47 (2013)
 Top Blues Albums at No. 7 (2013, 2014)
 Wild Heart Top Heatseekers at No. 14 (2015)
 Top Blues Albums at No. 1 (2015)
 Chills & Fever Top Heatseekers at No. 7 (2017)
 Top Blues Albums at No. 3 (2017)Belle of the West 
 Top Heatseekers at No. 2 (2017)
 Top Blues Albums at No. 1 (2017)
 Kill or Be Kind Top Heatseekers at No. 1 (2019)
 Top Blues Albums at No. 1 (2019)
 Faster''
 Top Heatseekers at No. 18 (2021)
 Top Blues Albums at No. 1 (2021)

Notes

References

External links

 
 SamanthaFishFans website
 
 
 

1989 births
Living people
21st-century American women guitarists
21st-century American women singers
21st-century American singers
American blues guitarists
American blues singer-songwriters
American blues singers
American women singer-songwriters
Guitarists from Missouri
Musicians from Kansas City, Missouri
Rounder Records artists
Ruf Records artists
Singer-songwriters from Missouri